Andrei Zarenkov (born 31 August 1959 in Tallinn) is an Estonian politician.

He has been the leader of Maardu Cultural Centre.

He has been the chairman of Constitution Party and a member of the central leadership of the Estonian Left Party

References

Living people
1959 births
Estonian people of Russian descent
Politicians from Tallinn